Trypauchen is a genus of burrowing gobies native to the Indo-Pacific region. It is classified under the subfamily Amblyopinae of the family Gobiidae. The name is derived from Ancient Greek τρύπα (trupa, "hole") and αυχενος (aukhenos, "neck"), referring to the distinctive opercular pouches of the members of the genus.

Species
There are currently two recognized species in this genus:
 Trypauchen pelaeos Murdy, 2006
 Trypauchen vagina (Bloch & J. G. Schneider, 1801)

References

Amblyopinae